Phil Margera (born July 13, 1957) is an American reality television personality known for appearing on Viva La Bam, the CKY videos and the Jackass television series and movies. He is the father of CKY drummer Jess Margera and Jackass star and professional skateboarder Bam Margera.

Life and career 
Margera is the second of seven children born to Phillip and Darlene Margera. He moved to West Chester where he met and married his wife April in 1976. Margera has Italian ancestry and worked as a baker prior to his career in television.

He first appeared on film in the CKY series of videos, and it was these appearances that later got featured on Jackass. He was also in the main cast of Viva La Bam. On television, Margera is depicted as kind, gentle, easy going and quiet, whereas his brother Vincent "Don Vito" Margera was portrayed as loud and obnoxious.

Margera appeared on the second season of Celebrity Fit Club on VH1. When the show began, he weighed in at 353 pounds (160 kg). He lost the most weight on the show, losing a total of 41 pounds (18 kg), down to 312 pounds (142 kg). In season 4, both BoneCrusher and Tina Yothers beat Margera's record, losing 51 and 42 lbs (23 and 19 kg) respectively. During a weigh-in on the show, Margera stated his reason for losing weight was to extend his life in order to spend more time with his granddaughter, Ava.

He also appeared in the 2004 video game Tony Hawk's Underground 2, in which he joins Tony Hawk's and Bam Margera's crew on a "World Destruction Tour" wearing nothing but underwear and dress socks.

Filmography

Films

Television

Video games

References

External links 

American people of Italian descent
American television personalities
American bakers
CKY
Living people
1957 births
Jackass (TV series)